A squamous cell papilloma is a generally benign papilloma that arises from the stratified squamous epithelium of the skin, lip, oral cavity, tongue, pharynx, larynx, esophagus, cervix, vagina or anal canal. Squamous cell papillomas are typically associated with human papillomavirus (HPV) while sometimes the cause is unknown.

Types

Oral squamous cell papilloma
Squamous cell papilloma of the mouth or throat is generally diagnosed in people between the ages of 30 and 50, and is normally found on the inside of the cheek, on the tongue, or inside of lips. Oral papillomas are usually painless, and not treated unless they interfere with eating or are causing pain. They do not generally mutate to cancerous growths, nor do they normally grow or spread. Oral papillomas are most usually a result of the infection with types HPV-6 and HPV-11.

Conjunctival squamous cell papilloma
Normally found in children or young adults, a common cause of conjunctival squamous cell papilloma is during childbirth, when the mother passes the virus to her child.

Diagnosis
It appears as an exophytic mass made of cauliflower appearance. The lesion may be white, red, or normal in color. It appears as sessile or pedunculated mass. Histopathology typically shows papillomatous protrusions and/or dysplasia.

Treatment
While most cases require no treatment, therapy options include cryotherapy, application of a topical salicylic acid compound,  surgical excision and laser ablation.

References

External links 

Benign neoplasms
Papillomavirus-associated diseases